Abdellah Hammoudi (born in 1945) is a Moroccan anthropologist, ethnographer, and emeritus professor of anthropology at Princeton University.

Biography 
Abdellah was born in Kalaat Sraghna in 1945. He received a bachelor's degree in philosophy from the Faculty of Letters at University of Mohammed V, and, at the same time, a degree in sociology from the Institute of Sociology. He obtained his doctorate from the Pantheon-Sorbonne University in 1977. From 1972 to 1989, he worked as a Professor at the Agronomic Institute of the Mohammed V University in Rabat. Before moving to the United States of America as a Faisal Visiting Professor for Anthropology at Princeton University in 1989, and he joined permanently faculty in 1991, a post which he held until his retirement on 1 July 2016 when he was given the title emeritus professor. He was the Founding Director and served for over ten years as Director of the University's Institute for the Transregional Study of the Contemporary Middle East, North Africa, and Central Asia.

Works 

 

This book is about the practice of bujlood.

Awards 
In 1998, he was awarded a Guggenheim Fellowship from the John Simon Guggenheim Memorial Foundation.

In 2005, he won the second Prize Lettre Ulysses Award for the "Art of Reportage", for his non-fiction work entitled Une saison à la Mecque: récit de pélerinage.

References 

1945 births
People from El Kelaa des Sraghna
Mohammed V University alumni
University of Paris alumni
Princeton University faculty
Moroccan writers
Academic staff of Mohammed V University
Moroccan anthropologists
20th-century anthropologists
21st-century anthropologists
Living people